Riverside is a suburban neighborhood within the Uptown section of Harrisburg, Pennsylvania. It is bordered by Front Street and the Susquehanna River to the west, Vaughn Street (and municipal line to Susquehanna Township) to the north, 7th Street and Railroad tracks to the east, and Division Street to the south. Riverside is known for its diversity of housing stock in price, size, and style which typically contain yards, driveways, and proximity to both the Susquehanna River and Italian Lake.

History
Originally a part of Susquehanna Township, it was annexed to the city on September 6, 1917. There was consideration beforehand of incorporating it as a separate borough, but with substantial growth it was more popular to elect Riverside to the city in regards to equalizing taxes, particularly toward improving road quality. A separate fire company which was formed in 1915 completed construction on its firehouse in 1923, which stood largely as a community center for decades until going up for sale by the Harrisburg Redevelopment Authority (HRA) in November 2019. The Uptown Plaza, originally named the Harrisburg Shopping Center, was opened in May 1957 at 7th & Division Streets as one of the first in the area and still remains in business today.

See also
 Italian Lake

References

Neighborhoods in Harrisburg, Pennsylvania